Moontoast was a social media advertising platform providing a form of media for social media advertising. Moontoast's headquarters were in Boston, Massachusetts, with offices in Nashville, Tennessee, and San Francisco, California. Moontoast is no longer operational.

History
Moontoast was co-founded by Joe Glaser, Creator of Glaser Instruments, Chief Technology Officer Marcus Whitney (a former partner at EMMA), and pedal steel guitarist Bucky Baxter.

The company launched at SXSW in 2008 and added the social media platform in September 2010.

In 2013, Toyota and Moontoast also created an Instagram gallery which played 15-second Instagram videos within a swipe-able video gallery.

The company worked with Lexus to show the 2014 Lexus IS live from the Detroit Auto Show, which received over 100,000 video views in 10 minutes.

In October 2014, Moontoast changed its name to Spend setter after buying loyalty rewards company Spend ship. Co-founder Marcus Whitney announced that he was leaving his CTO position in the company and would be replaced by Spend ship founder, Jason Weaver.

The company was funded by The Martin Companies and music industry angel investors.

References

External links
 

Digital marketing companies of the United States
Internet properties established in 2009